Anti-Chechen sentiment or Chechenophobia, Nokhchophobia and Anti-Chechenism refers to fear, dislike, hostility, and racism towards ethnic Chechens and anything related to Chechen culture and North Caucasian culture in general. Anti-Chechen sentiment has been historically strong in Russia, and to some degree has spread to other countries in the former Soviet Union, such as  Azerbaijan and Armenia, to Europe (Poland, France), the Middle East (Syria), and to the United States. For decades, the main causes of hatred against Chechens have been largely due to the created narrative which depicts a violent mentality of Chechens, the Chechen adherence to Islam and anti-Chechen Russian imperialist motives.

Examples of anti-Chechen hostility

Russia

Fear and negative stereotypes of Chechens stem largely from the history of the Russian conquest of Chechnya and Dagestan, when Russia conquered the Chechen territory in 1859 and merged it with the Russian Empire. Russian general Aleksey Yermolov openly disliked Chechens, who considered them bold and dangerous, and called for mass genocide of the Chechens due to their resistance against Russia. Eventually, when Russia absorbed Chechnya into its territory, mass ethnic cleansing of Chechens occurred in the 1860s.

Due to the Chechens' refusal to accept Russian rule, a number of violent conflicts erupted in Chechnya in an attempt to free Chechnya from Russia. This was often met with brutal reprisals by the Russian authorities, such as the bloody repression of Chechens in 1932 by the Soviet military. During World War II, the Soviet authorities blamed Chechens for supporting Nazi Germany, resulting with the tragic Aardakh in which many Chechens were deported to Siberia and Central Asia, with many dying on the journey. These tensions were superseded by ethnic conflict in the 1950s and 1960s where Russians and Chechens clashed in Grozny. Soviet authorities generally sided with Russians against Chechens.

The conflict between Chechens and Russians reached its peak when the Soviet Union collapsed in 1991, and Chechen nationalists, led by Dzhokhar Dudayev, proclaimed the Chechen Republic of Ichkeria and sought to separate from Russia, causing the First and Second Chechen Wars. The Russian military responded harshly against ethnic Chechens, especially in the second war where an estimated thousand or more Chechen civilians were killed by the Russian military.

Ethnic violence between Russians and Chechens was common in to 2000s, due to alleged Chechen links with Islamic terrorism, leading to an increased number of racist killings against Chechens. In 2007, 18-year-old Artur Ryno claimed responsibility for 37 racially motivated murders in one year, saying that "since school [he] hated people from the Caucasus." On 5 June 2007, an anti-Chechen riot involving hundreds of people took place in the town of Stavropol in southern Russia. Rioters demanded the eviction of ethnic Chechens following the murder of two young Russians who locals believed were killed by Chechens. The event revived memories of a recent clash between Chechens and local Russians in Kondopoga which started when two Russians were killed over an unpaid bill. Chechens in the Russian Armed Forces have also faced frequent violent activities against them by Russian military instructors.

In modern times, this was also evoked by the Irish MMA fighter Conor McGregor when he faced Khabib Nurmagomedov, stating that the Chechens and Dagestanis are hostile to each other due to the memory of old Chechen conflict and the accusation of Dagestani betrayal by Chechens.

North Ossetia
In North Ossetia–Alania, during the East Prigorodny Conflict of the 1990s, ethnic Ossetian militia groups, many supported by the Russian government, committed ethnic cleansing of Ingush; a close relative of the Chechens, as well as the Chechens themselves, due to Chechen support for Ingush against Ossetians.

Georgia

Pankisi Gorge
Pankisi Gorge is home to a large Chechen population in Georgia, and the region has suffered from poverty and xenophobia due to increasing radical Islamism within the gorge. In addition, the Pankisi Gorge crisis in the early 2000s led to a stereotype of Chechens as terrorists and jihadists.

South Ossetia
In South Ossetia, a breakaway region of Georgia, Chechens have generally supported Georgia against the separatist movement in South Ossetia. This led to ethnic cleansing against Chechens in the 1990s by South Ossetian forces and was soon escalated by the Russo-Georgian War in 2008. Today, there are virtually no Chechen communities left in South Ossetia.

Armenia
Anti-Chechen sentiment occurred in Armenia due to the support of certain Chechens for Azerbaijan, the enemy of Armenia in the First Nagorno-Karabakh War, with Chechen forces under Shamil Basayev participating directly in the conflict. Chechens had also been accused of fighting against Armenia on the side of Azerbaijan during the recent 2020 Nagorno-Karabakh conflict.

Kazakhstan

Poland
Poland welcomed Chechen refugees during the 1990s in support of the Chechen quest to regain freedom from Russia. However, since the 2010s, especially with the rise of the far-right wing party Law and Justice and increasing Islamic terrorism in Europe, the Polish attitude toward Chechens had become increasingly negative. Some have blamed Chechens for inflaming terrorist attacks due to their Islamic belief, notably the Polish interior minister Mariusz Błaszczak in 2016, who accused the Chechens of being terrorists. This was followed by the increasing denial of Chechen asylum seekers, with thousands of Chechens fleeing Russia forcibly sent back by Polish authorities if 2015 and 2016. The anti-Chechen policy by the Polish government has been criticized by the European Union, of which Poland is a member, and the European Court of Human Rights, which ruled in 2020 against Poland for perceived Chechenophobia by the Polish authorities.

In 2017, Azamat Baiduyev, son of a former bodyguard to Chechen President Dzhokhar Dudayev in the 1990s, was forcibly deported from Belgium to Poland due to an uncertain connection to terrorist activities. He was later deported back to Russia by Poland, despite outcries in 2018. Chechen refugee Nurmagomed Nurmagomedov was granted asylum in Poland in 2019, but had his asylum right revoked. He faced charges of terrorism and was about to be deported back to Russia before a Polish Lawyer from the Border organization intervened.

Germany 
German far-right radicals and skinheads often attacked Chechen immigrants because of their origin. After the mass brawl between Germans and Chechens in Reinsberg in 2020, the mayor of  Reinsberg Frank Shwokhov admitted that the German integration policy had failed.

Inter-ethnic clashes also took place between Kurds and Chechens.

Belgium
In 2017, Azamat Baiduyev, the son of a former bodyguard of Chechen President Dzhokhar Dudayev in the 1990s, was forcibly deported from Belgium to Poland due to speculated connections to terrorist activities, after which Poland later deported him back to Russia despite outcries in 2018. Belgium had been criticized for its anti-Chechen policies given that the country is home to the European Union headquarters, and due to Belgium's unwillingness to confront Russia as Brussels sought Moscow's support to counter Islamic terrorism.

The Chechen diaspora in Belgium has been exposed to violence by Kurdish immigrants.

United States
Following the Boston Marathon bombing by two Chechen immigrants, anti-Chechen sentiment intermingled with Islamophobia grew in the United States. Many Chechen-Americans had expressed fear of reprisals and racism by American nationalists.

In May 2013 the United States Senate amended laws to tighten visa requirements. The new requirements were thought to be deliberately anti-Chechen.

After Donald Trump's victory in the 2016 election and the subsequent "Muslim ban", the new US government helped Moscow assist a Chechen refugee in Europe.

Azerbaijan
Historically, Azerbaijan has been seen as welcoming to Chechens, and during the 1990s there was strong mutual respect between Chechens and Azerbaijanis. The Chechens volunteered to fight for Azerbaijan against Armenia in Karabakh, while Azerbaijan welcomed Chechen refugees fleeing war in their homeland. However, increasing adherence to the Salafi movement by Chechens, Chechen involvement in kidnapping and mass murder, as well as its terrorist tendencies, led to a sharp rise of Chechen Islamic radicalism, which caused the public perception of Chechens in Azerbaijan to deteriorate.

Syria
Chechens have been largely able to integrate within Syrian society. However, due to the alliance between the al-Assad family and Russia, antagonism against Chechens started to increase in 2011 following Chechen participation with the opposition forces against the al-Assad government. Chechens have also endured repression by the Ba'athist regime due to cultural differences, and have struggled to preserve their cultural heritage.

Israel
As Chechens sympathize with Palestinians due to common Islamic beliefs, there is a significant hostility against Chechens in Israel. In 2010, Israeli Prime Minister Benjamin Netanyahu openly compared Hamas with the Chechens, stating that they are terrorists, in response to Russia and Turkey's quest to not exclude Hamas in the peace process between Israel and Palestine.

In 2013, after Beitar Jerusalem signed two Chechen Muslim players, Zaur Sadayev and Dzhabrail Kadiyev, anti-Chechen protest erupted by Beitar Jerusalem's supporters due to their Islamic belief. Beitar fans also showed anti-Chechen sentiment by leaving the stadium on 3 March when Sadayev scored the first goal for the club. In addition, many openly stated that it was not racist to hate Chechens and Muslims.

France
In June 2020, violence erupted in Dijon by Chechens causing unrest in the city, which increased French police patrols.

Meanwhile, Chechen terrorism has also been seen to be on the rise in France. In 2018, a Chechen-born terrorist carried out a knife attack in Paris. In 2020, a Chechen teen beheaded a teacher over Prophet Muhammad's controversy. This has led to increasing Chechenophobia in France.

French right-wing politicians, many of whom have pro-Russian sentiments, expressed anti-Chechen statements, such as Eric Zemmour, who called Chechen children "terrorists, rapists, thieves".

Hungary
In 2017, a Chechen man with alleged ties to the FSB forced a Hungarian activist and rapper to apologize after throwing balloons filled with food coloring at the monument to Soviet Liberators in Freedom Square in the capital city of Budapest. This has led to significant fear and hostility toward Chechens, who are accused of working for Russia, although the Chechen population in Hungary is small. Likewise, Hungary's support for Poland's radical anti-migrant policies, including its deportation of Chechens since 2015, has also been seen as anti-Chechen.

See also
Islamophobia
Racism in Russia

References

 
Chechen sentiment, Anti-
Racism